John Leland (May 14, 1754 – January 14, 1841) was an American Baptist minister who preached in Massachusetts and Virginia, as well as an outspoken abolitionist. He was an important figure in the struggle for religious liberty in the United States. Leland also later opposed the rise of missionary societies among Baptists.

Early life
Leland was born on May 14, 1754, in Grafton, Massachusetts.
His parents were Congregationalists. He married Sally Devine and they had nine children, Betsy, Hannah, Polly, John, Sally, Lucy, Fanny, Nancy, &  Lemuel.

Public life and views

He was baptized in June 1774 by Elder Noah Alden. Leland joined the Baptist Church in Bellingham, Massachusetts, in 1775. He left for Virginia in 1775 or 1776, and ministered there until 1791, when he returned to Massachusetts.

During the 1788-89 election while still living in Virginia, Leland threw his support behind James Madison due to Madison's support for religious liberty in what became the First Amendment to the Constitution, and Madison was seated in the first Congress that same year. Leland returned to Massachusetts in 1791 the year the Bill of Rights was ratified, leaving Virginia after an anti-slavery sermon. Back in New England, Leland helped to found several Baptist congregations in Connecticut, to which President Jefferson later wrote his famous letter to the Baptists of Danbury, Connecticut in 1802 regarding religious freedom.

A well-known incident in Leland's life was the Cheshire Mammoth Cheese. The people of Cheshire, Massachusetts made and sent a giant block of cheese to President Thomas Jefferson. Leland took the block from Cheshire to Washington, D. C., and presented it to Jefferson on January 1, 1802. While there, Leland was even invited to preach to the Congress and the President. Of this incident he wrote, "In November, 1801 I journeyed to the south, as far as Washington, in charge of a cheese, sent to President Jefferson. Notwithstanding my trust, I preached all the way there and on my return. I had large congregations; let in part by curiosity to hear the Mammoth Priest, as I was called." He was invited to preach a message of religious liberty in Congress upon his arrival.

For Michael I. Meyerson, Leland was the most prominent religious figure of the founding era to champion universal religious freedom. John M. Cobin says that Leland held, in seminal form, to the "liberty of conscience" position on public policy theology.

Leland died on January 14, 1841, in North Adams, Massachusetts. His tombstone reads, "Here lies the body of John Leland, of Cheshire, who labored 67 years to promote piety and vindicate the civil and religious rights of all men."

He was known as a hymn writer; "The Day Is Past and Gone, The Evening Shades Appear" has been included in 391 hymnals. Several of his hymns are preserved in the Sacred Harp.

Leland opposed theological seminaries. Ironically, The John Leland Center for Theological Studies in Virginia is named in his honor. The school was named for Leland for three reasons: his firm stand for religious liberty for all, his opposition to slavery, and his service as a pastor and evangelist.

Excerpts from his writings
"The notion of a Christian commonwealth should be exploded forever...Government should protect every man in thinking and speaking freely, and see that one does not abuse another. The liberty I contend for is more than toleration. The very idea of toleration is despicable; it supposes that some have a pre-eminence above the rest to grant indulgence, whereas all should be equally free, Jews, Turks, Pagans and Christians." - A Chronicle of His Time in Virginia.
"Truth disdains the aid of law for its defense — it will stand upon its own merits." - Right of Conscience Inalienable.
"Every man must give account of himself to God, and therefore every man ought to be at liberty to serve God in a way that he can best reconcile to his conscience. If government can answer for individuals at the day of judgment, let men be controlled by it in religious matters; otherwise, let men be free." - Right of Conscience Inalienable.
"Resolved, that slavery is a violent deprivation of rights of nature and inconsistent with a republican government, and therefore, recommend it to our brethren to make use of every legal measure to extirpate this horrid evil from the land; and pray Almighty God that our honorable legislature may have it in their power to proclaim the great jubilee, consistent with the principles of good policy." - Resolution for the General Committee of Virginia Baptists meeting in Richmond, Virginia, in 1789.

Sources

References

1754 births
1841 deaths
Baptist ministers from the United States
Christian hymnwriters
People from Grafton, Massachusetts
People from Cheshire, Massachusetts